Valdon Kape Dowiyogo (31 August 1968 – 8 December 2016) was a political figure and cabinet minister from the Pacific nation of the Republic of Nauru.

Family and political background

His father, Bernard Dowiyogo, served as President of Nauru on seven occasions between 1976 and 2003. His brother, Jesaulenko Dowiyogo, is also pursuing a political career.

Valdon Dowiyogo stood for the Parliament of Nauru for the constituency of Ubenide and was duly elected.

Speaker of the Parliament of Nauru

On 27 December 2004 he was elected Speaker of the Parliament of Nauru. The occasion of his appointment was the death in office of the previous Speaker, Vassal Gadoengin. He served until December 2007.

Member of the Cabinet

In 2013 Dowiyogo was appointed by President Baron Waqa to be a member of his Cabinet. Dowiyogo held the portfolios of Health, Transport, Sports, and Fisheries. Dowiyogo died on 8 December 2016 in Russia. He had been in declining health prior to his death.

See also

 Politics of Nauru
 Political families of the world#Nauru
 Christine Dowiyogo

References

1968 births
2016 deaths
Members of the Parliament of Nauru
Nauruan Christians
Nauruan politicians of Japanese descent
Nauruan people of i-Kiribati descent
Nauruan sportsperson-politicians
Speakers of the Parliament of Nauru
Children of national leaders
Government ministers of Nauru
21st-century Nauruan politicians